Abraham & Lincoln is a 2007 Indian Malayalam Language Action-Thriller film directed by Pramod Pappan and written by Dennis Joseph. The film stars Kalabhavan Mani and Rahman starring in the titular roles, with Shweta Menon, Neha Pendse, Anoop Menon, Bineesh Kodiyeri, Rajan P. Dev, Salim Kumar and Baburaj in supporting roles. The film is inspired by the 2004 Hindi film Dhoom. It is the first Malayalam film to use the Bullet time effect for its action sequences.

Synopsis
The film starts by showing a gold smuggling syndicate named Sonar Kella. Sonar Kella's owner, Shankarnath, Hires a bike racer to smuggle some gold, but on the way, the bike racer was killed by the henchmen of Sonar Kella's rival gang named Ravuther Group. Gangster Abraham, the bike racer's brother, investigates the death of his brother. Along the way, he discovers some shocking information that strengthens his determination to find his brother's killer. He becomes a hired thug and infiltrates the mafia. At the same time, Police Officer Lincoln,  begins investigating the same mafia that Abraham has just joined. Lincoln suspects that they are to blame for ruining his brother's life. Abraham's life takes an unexpected turn as he joins forces with Lincoln in an effort to take the criminals down.

Cast
 Kalabhavan Mani as Abraham.
 Rahman as Lincoln
 Anoop Menon as Collector Philip Mathew
 Dinesh Prabhakar as Constable
 Neha Pendse as nansy
 Baburaj as Ameen
 Shwetha Menon
 Bineesh Kodiyeri
 Kalabhavan Narayanankutty
 Kollam Thulasi
 Balachandran Chullikkadu
 Kripa
 Salim Kumar as Constable Marcos 
Rajan P. Dev as Ravuthar
TG Ravi as Minister Kottara Mathan
 Vimal Raj	
 Kiran Raj
Biyon
 Sreejith Ravi as Usman

Soundtrack
Song: Udurajamukhi 
Movie: Abraham and Lincoln
Music: Ouseppachan
Lyrics: Balachandran Chullikkad
Singers: Manjari
Source 1: Male Voice
Source 2: Female Voice

Song:Kezhamaan kannaale
Singers: Kalabhavan Mani and

The song has been taken from a Malayalam film "Abraham & Lincoln."

References

External links

2007 films
2000s Malayalam-language films
Films directed by Pramod Pappan